The House of the Scorpion is a 2002 science fiction young adult novel by Nancy Farmer. It is set in the future and mostly takes place in Opium, a country which separates Aztlán (formerly Mexico) and the United States. The main character Matteo Alacrán, or Matt, is a young clone of a drug lord of the same name, usually called "El Patrón". It is a story about the struggle to survive as a free individual and the search for a personal identity.

Background 
The idea was originally from a short story that Farmer wrote for an anthology, which she withdrew and then expanded after realizing it was too closely tied to her own life. The novel is partly inspired by Farmer's experience of rescuing a Mexican immigrant from dying in the desert, as is evidenced in the theme of illegal immigration.

On her personal website, Farmer says she wrote the novel for her son, who is dyslexic. Also on her website, Farmer notes that swear words were removed from the manuscript before publication, and that she wished the novel were 50 pages longer.

Farmer chose the scorpion symbol because El Patrón, a main character in the novel, is from the Mexican state of Durango.

Farmer based many of the novel's characters on figures from her life, both in childhood and present day.

Plot
This story is set in the country of Opium, a narrow strip of land between Mexico (now called Aztlán), and the United States, which is ruled by the original Matteo Alacrán, or El Patrón, an incredibly powerful drug lord, who is over 140 years old. Opium consists of several drug-producing Farms, the Alacrán estate (which produces opium poppies) being the largest and where some of the Alacrán family stay.

The protagonist, Matt, is a clone of El Patrón. For the first six years of his life, he lives in a small house on the edge of the poppy fields with Celia, a cook working in El Patrón's mansion. When he is discovered by three children, Emilia, Steven, and Maria, he smashes a window and jumps out of the house. Unaware of the danger of jumping barefoot onto smashed glass, he has to be carried to El Patrón's mansion to be treated for his injuries. Matt is treated kindly until Mr. Alacrán, El Patrón's great-grandson, recognizes him as a clone, which results in a few months of him being locked in a room and treated like an animal. When he finds out, El Patrón is furious and gives Matt clothes and his own room and commands everyone to treat him with respect. Matt is also given a bodyguard, Tam Lin, a reformed terrorist who becomes a father figure to Matt.

During the seven years that Matt lives in the house, he befriends María, which gradually blossoms into romance. Matt is kept in the dark about his identity, however, until a cruel joke reveals to him that he is a clone. Matt also discovers that all clones are supposed to be injected when "harvested" (born) with a compound that cripples their brains and turns them into little more than thrashing, drooling animals meant to donate organs. In denial, he convinces himself that El Patrón would not hire tutors for him and keep him entertained if he wanted to kill him and that instead, he must be wanted to run the country when El Patrón dies.

At Steven and Emilia's wedding, El Patrón has a nearly-fatal heart attack. Matt and María attempt to flee in the ensuing chaos but are betrayed by the newlyweds. María is taken back to the convent in which she studies, and Matt is taken to the hospital, where El Patrón finally confirms that Matt was created only as an organ donor to keep him alive. At that moment, Celia reveals that she has been giving Matt doses of arsenic, which were not large enough to kill Matt but would be deadly to one as frail as El Patrón. The resulting rage of El Patrón causes him to have a fatal heart attack. Mr. Alacrán calls doctors to take him to emergency surgery, and after El Patrón dies, he orders Tam Lin to dispose of Matt. Tam Lin pretends to comply but gives Matt supplies and sets him on a path to Aztlán.

Arriving in Aztlán, Matt comes across a group of orphans, the "Lost Boys," who live in an orphanage operated by the "Keepers," a group of fervent Marxists who preach the "Five Principles of Good Citizenship" and the "Four Attitudes Leading to Right-Mindfulness". The Keepers operate plankton farms, force the orphans to do manual labor and to subsist on plankton, while they themselves enjoy luxurious quarters and food. At first, Matt is an outcast because the other boys think he is a spoiled aristocrat. However, he becomes a hero when he defies the Keepers and leads the boys in a rebellion.

He then is shut up in a closet for the night after the incident, until the next morning. Here, he is dumped in the "Boneyard", a dried lake full of whale bones, delicately balanced. After he manages to get free, he and Chacho are rescued by Ton-Ton and Fidelito, who drive the shrimp harvester to San Luis to find María and her mother, the politically-powerful Esperanza Mendoza.

Esperanza thanks the boys for giving her the ability to take down the Keepers. Matt learns that Opium is in a country-wide lockdown but manages to re-enter the country, only to learn that the entire Alacrán family is dead, and the estate is empty except for servants, including Celia. Those at El Patrón's wake, including Tam Lin, who promised El Patron, drank poisoned wine, which El Patrón saved to be served at his funeral since he never intended to die and wanted to run the business forever or to have it and everyone else die with him.

Matt takes on the role of El Patrón to become the new ruler of Opium and to dismantle the regime.

Themes 
The House of the Scorpion is a story about the struggle to survive as a free individual and the search for a personal identity. The novel deals with issues and ethics around human cloning.

Literary style 
Though the novel details moral issues involved with human cloning, in his review for The New York Times, Roger Sutton argued that the novel is only nominally science fiction, and is more often a realistic fiction tale with elements of the adventure story.

Reception 
Reviewing the novel in The New York Times, Roger Sutton traced the novel's roots back to Pinocchio, as both novels feature non-human characters desperate to become human. Sutton called the novel "a big, ambitious tale."

Publishers Weekly, in a starred review of the novel, noted that "Farmer grippingly demonstrates that there are no easy answers. The questions she raises will haunt readers long after the final page."

Kirkus Reviews, also in a starred review, called The House of the Scorpion "a must-read for SF fans."

The Lord of Opium 
As The House of the Scorpion drew on so much of her childhood, Farmer found it difficult to write the sequel, The Lord of Opium. The sequel was published on September 3, 2013. The story begins a few hours after the final events of the first book.

Awards
It won the U.S. National Book Award for Young People's Literature and was named a Newbery Honor Book and a Michael L. Printz Honor Book. In the speculative fiction field, it was a runner-up for the Locus Award in the young adult category and the Mythopoeic Award in the children's category.
National Book Award for Young People's Literature (United States), 2002—winner
 Northern California Book Award 2002
 Newbery Honor, 2003—runner-up for Newbery Medal
 Michael L. Printz Award Honor Book, 2003
 Buxtehuder Bulle, Germany, 2003
 ALA Best Book for Young Adults 2003
 IRA Young Adults' Choices for 2004
 Volunteer State Young Adult Book Award, 2004–05
 Nevada Young Reader's Award in the Young Adult category, 2005
 Senior Young Readers Choice Award, Pacific Northwest Library Association, 2005
 Sequoyah Young Adult Award for 2005
 Grand Canyon Reader Teen Award, 2005
 South Carolina Association of School Librarians Junior Book Award, 2005–2006
 Young Hoosier Book Award Middle Grades, 2006

Further reading 

 Kerr, R. (2010). "The Father, Son, and the Holy Clone: Revision of Biblical Genesis in 'The House of the Scorpion.'" The Journal of the Midwest Modern Language Association, 43(2), 99.

References

External links

2002 American novels
2002 science fiction novels
Novels by Nancy Farmer
American science fiction novels
Dystopian novels
Novels about cloning
National Book Award for Young People's Literature winning works
Novels set in fictional countries
Atheneum Books books